The siliceous sponges form a major group of the phylum Porifera, consisting of classes Demospongiae and Hexactinellida. They are characterized by spicules made out of silicon dioxide, unlike calcareous sponges.

Individual siliachoates (silica skeleton scaffolding) can be arranged tightly within the sponginocyte or crosshatched and fused together. Siliceous spicules come in two sizes called megascleres and microscleres.

Systematics 
Most studies support the monophyly of siliceous sponges.

The group, as a part of the phylum Porifera, has been named Silicispongia Schmidt, 1862 and Silicea Bowerbank, 1864. Silicarea is a proposed new phylum based on molecular studies of the phylum Porifera. It consists of the Poriferan classes Demospongiae and Hexactinellida. Some scientists believe that Porifera is polyphyletic/paraphyletic, and that some sponges, the Calcarea, are a separate phylum which was the first to diverge from the main line of kingdom Animalia. Silicarea is considered the next phylum to diverge from the primary animal lineage.

Ecology 
Siliceous sponges are usually found in the marine ecosystem but they are occasionally found in freshwater.

References 

Sponge biology
Silicon dioxide